The first USS Pequot was a  wooden screw gunboat of the Union Navy during the American Civil War. The ship was launched on 4 June 1863 by the Boston Navy Yard; and commissioned there on 15 January 1864, Lt. Comdr. Stephen P. Quackenbush in command. The ship was named for the Pequot Indian tribe resident in Southern Connecticut, members of the Algonquian language grouping.

Service history
The new gunboat departed Boston on 5 February and joined the North Atlantic Blockading Squadron. She captured British blockade runner Don off Beaufort, North Carolina, on 4 March, and helped the Army beat back a Confederate attack on Wilson's Wharf, James River, Virginia, on 24 May. Blockade duty occupied her until she participated in the first and the second battles on Fort Fisher which protected Wilmington, North Carolina, on 24 February 1864 and 13 January 1865, closing that last major Confederate port. She followed this victory by helping capture Fort Anderson, North Carolina.

Post-war
After the end of the Civil War, she was decommissioned at the New York Navy Yard on 3 June 1865. She remained there in reserve until she was sold to Haiti in 1869, where the ship was renamed Terreur. In December of that year, she was captured by rebels. Terreur was then used to blow up the presidential palace by hitting the barrels of gunpowder stored within.

References 

 

Ships of the Union Navy
Ships built in Boston
Steamships of the United States Navy
Gunboats of the United States Navy
American Civil War patrol vessels of the United States
1863 ships